Mahendra Surasinghe Wijeratne (12 March 1934 - March 2011) was a Sri Lankan politician. He was the former Minister of Livestock Development and Milk Production; and Deputy Minister of Trade and Shipping. Wijeratne was elected Member of Parliament from Mirigama having contested the 1977 general election from the United National Party defeating J. P. Obeysekera.  

He was married to Mallika Wijeratne. They had three children. His son Udena Wijerathna is a Member of Western Provincial Council and daughter Maheshi is a Consultant Neuro Surgeon.

References

1934 births
2011 deaths
Cabinet ministers of Sri Lanka
Deputy ministers of Sri Lanka
Members of the 8th Parliament of Sri Lanka
Sinhalese politicians
United National Party politicians